Dennis M. DeTurck (born July 15, 1954) is an American mathematician known for his work in partial differential equations and Riemannian geometry, in particular contributions to the theory of the Ricci flow and the prescribed Ricci curvature problem. He first used the DeTurck trick to give an alternative proof of the short time existence of the Ricci flow, which has found other uses since then.

Education 
DeTurck received a B.S. (1976) from Drexel University. He received an M.A. (1978) and Ph.D. (1980) in mathematics from the University of Pennsylvania. His Ph.D. supervisor was Jerry Kazdan.

Career 
DeTurck is currently Robert A. Fox Leadership Professor and Professor of Mathematics at the University of Pennsylvania, where he has been the Dean of the College of Arts and Sciences since 2005 and Faculty Director of Riepe College House. In 2002, DeTurck won the Haimo Award from the Mathematical Association of America for his teaching. Despite being recognized for excellence in teaching, he has been criticized for his belief that fractions are "as obsolete as Roman numerals" and suggesting that they not be taught to younger students.

In January 2012, he shared the Chauvenet Prize with three mathematical collaborators. In 2012, he became a fellow of the American Mathematical Society.

Selected publications

 (explains the DeTurck trick; also see the improved version)

References

External links
Article with some career and biographical info
Dennis DeTurck's homepage

1954 births
Living people
20th-century American mathematicians
21st-century American mathematicians
Mathematical analysts
University of Pennsylvania alumni
University of Pennsylvania faculty
Mathematicians at the University of Pennsylvania
Fellows of the American Mathematical Society
Drexel University alumni
Differential geometers